Code page 856 (CCSID 856) (also known as CP 856 and IBM 00856), is a code page used under DOS for Hebrew in Israel.

Like ISO 8859-8, it encodes only letters, not vowel-points or cantillation marks;  includes all characters of ISO 8859-8. As non-localized issues of DOS (except for Hebrew MS-DOS a.k.a. HDOS) had no inherent bidirectionality support, Hebrew text encoded using code page 856 was usually stored in visual order;  nevertheless, a few DOS applications, notably a word processor named EinsteinWriter, stored Hebrew in logical order.

CCSID 9048 added the euro currency symbol and new sheqel sign, and added direction controls at code points A0 through A6hex.

Character set
The following table shows code page 856. Each character is shown with its equivalent Unicode code point. Only the second half of the table (code points 128–255) is shown, the first half (code points 0–127) being the same as code page 437.

References

856